Michael Phillip Lulume Bayigga is a Ugandan physician and politician. He served as the Acting Secretary General of the Democratic Party from 2007 until 2010. He is also the Member of Parliament representing Buikwe South Constituency, in Buikwe District. and Director Kampala International Medical Centre Kansanga -Kampala.

Background and education
He was born on 1 May 1970. Lulume Bayiga attended St. Paul's Boys Primary School in Nkokonjeru, for his elementary education. He studied at Kyambogo College School in Kyambogo, Kampala for both his O-Level and A-Level studies. In 1991 he entered Makerere University School of Medicine, graduating in 1996 with the degree of Bachelor of Medicine and Bachelor of Surgery (MBChB). In 2004, he graduated from the Southern African Regional Institute for Policy Studies, at the University of Zimbabwe, with the degree of Master of Policy Studies.

Work experience
In 1997, he began to work at "Nsambya General Clinic", a private medical practice, as the Deputy Director, a position he still holds today. That same year, he was elected executive director of the Uganda Medical Volunteers' Association, an NGO, a position he still serves in today. He first entered politics in 2006 when he unsuccessfully contested for the Buikwe County South constituency seat against one Anthony Mukasa of the National Resistance Movement (NRM) party. Bayiga however petitioned the courts and the Uganda Supreme Court nullified the results on account of Mukasa having bribed voters. In the by-elections held in May 2008, Bayigga trounced his opponent and was sworn in as the Member of Parliament (MP) for the constituency on Wednesday May 7, 2007. He was re-elected in 2011.

Other considerations
Dr. Lulume Bayiga is married. He is reported to enjoy debating, table tennis and practicing medicine. He sits on the parliamentary committee on foreign affairs and on the committee for the budget.

See also
 List of political parties in Uganda
 List of hospitals in Uganda
 Parliament of Uganda

References

External links
Website of Buikwe District
Interview With Dr. Lulume Bayigga In 2007

1970 births
Living people
Baganda
People from Buikwe District
Ugandan activists
Members of the Parliament of Uganda
Buikwe District
21st-century Ugandan physicians
Makerere University alumni
University of Zimbabwe alumni
Democratic Party (Uganda) politicians
Ugandan Roman Catholics
20th-century Ugandan physicians
21st-century Ugandan politicians